The following is a partial list of the "E" codes for Medical Subject Headings (MeSH), as defined by the United States National Library of Medicine (NLM).

This list continues the information at List of MeSH codes (E04). Codes following these are found at List of MeSH codes (E06). For other MeSH codes, see List of MeSH codes.

The source for this content is the set of 2006 MeSH Trees from the NLM.

– investigative techniques

– animal experimentation

– rotarod performance test

– vivisection

– animal identification systems

– anthropometry

– cephalometry

– odontometry

– pelvimetry

– artifacts

– autoanalysis

– autopsy

– biological assay

– endpoint determination

– limulus test

– biomedical enhancement

– genetic enhancement

– body weights and measures

– body mass index

– body size
  – body height
  – body weight
  – birth weight
  – fetal weight

– body surface area

– crown-rump length

– organ size

– skinfold thickness

– tumor burden

– waist-hip ratio

– brain mapping

– calibration

– calorimetry

– calorimetry, indirect

– catheterization

– cementation

– centrifugation

– ultracentrifugation
  – centrifugation, density gradient
  – centrifugation, isopycnic
  – centrifugation, zonal

– chemistry, analytical

– activation analysis
  – neutron activation analysis

– biuret reaction

– calorimetry
  – calorimetry, differential scanning

– chemical fractionation
  – fractionation, field flow

– chromatography
  – chromatography, gas
  – flame ionization
  – mass fragmentography
  – chromatography, liquid
  – chromatography, affinity
  – chromatography, gel
  – chromatography, agarose
  – chromatography, high pressure liquid
  – chromatography, ion exchange
  – chromatography, deae-cellulose
  – chromatography, paper
  – nucleotide mapping
  – blotting, northern
  – blotting, southern
  – peptide mapping
  – chromatography, thin layer
  – countercurrent distribution
  – chromatography, micellar electrokinetic capillary
  – chromatography, supercritical fluid

– countercurrent distribution

– crystallization

– crystallography
  – neutron diffraction
  – powder diffraction
  – x-ray diffraction
  – crystallography, x-ray

– desiccation

– deuterium exchange measurement

– dialysis
  – microdialysis

– differential thermal analysis
  – calorimetry, differential scanning

– electrophoresis
  – electrophoresis, agar gel
  – comet assay
  – electrophoresis, capillary
  – electrophoresis, microchip
  – electrophoresis, cellulose acetate
  – electrophoresis, gel, pulsed-field
  – electrophoresis, gel, two-dimensional
  – electrophoresis, paper
  – nucleotide mapping
  – blotting, northern
  – blotting, southern
  – peptide mapping
  – electrophoresis, polyacrylamide gel
  – electrophoresis, disc
  – electrophoresis, gel, two-dimensional
  – electrophoresis, starch gel
  – electrophoretic mobility shift assay
  – immunoelectrophoresis
  – counterimmunoelectrophoresis
  – immunoelectrophoresis, two-dimensional
  – isoelectric focusing

– filtration
  – ultrafiltration
  – hemofiltration
  – hemodiafiltration

– flow injection analysis

– glucose clamp technique

– immunochemistry

– microchemistry

– microchip analytical procedures
  – microfluidic analytical techniques
  – electrophoresis, microchip
  – microarray analysis
  – oligonucleotide array sequence analysis
  – protein array analysis
  – tissue array analysis

– nucleotide mapping
  – blotting, northern
  – blotting, southern

– peptide mapping
  – protein footprinting

– photometry
  – densitometry
  – absorptiometry, photon
  – densitometry, x-ray
  – luminescent measurements
  – chemiluminescent measurements
  – fluorometry
  – cytophotometry
  – flow cytometry
  – image cytometry
  – laser scanning cytometry
  – fluorescence polarization
  – fluorescence polarization immunoassay
  – fluorescence recovery after photobleaching
  – fluorophotometry
  – spectrometry, fluorescence
  – fluorescence resonance energy transfer
  – nephelometry and turbidimetry
  – spectrophotometry
  – microspectrophotometry
  – spectrophotometry, atomic
  – spectrophotometry, infrared
  – spectroscopy, fourier transform infrared
  – spectrophotometry, ultraviolet

– polarography

– refractometry

– spectrum analysis
  – circular dichroism
  – magnetic resonance spectroscopy
  – electron spin resonance spectroscopy
  – nuclear magnetic resonance, biomolecular
  – optical rotatory dispersion
  – pulse radiolysis
  – spectrometry, fluorescence
  – spectrometry, gamma
  – spectroscopy, mossbauer
  – spectrometry, x-ray emission
  – electron probe microanalysis
  – spectrophotometry
  – microspectrophotometry
  – spectrophotometry, atomic
  – spectrophotometry, infrared
  – spectroscopy, fourier transform infrared
  – spectrophotometry, ultraviolet
  – spectroscopy, electron energy-loss
  – microscopy, energy-filtering transmission electron
  – spectroscopy, near-infrared
  – spectrum analysis, mass
  – mass fragmentography
  – spectrometry, mass, electrospray ionization
  – spectrometry, mass, fast atom bombardment
  – spectrometry, mass, matrix-assisted laser desorption-ionization
  – spectrometry, mass, secondary ion
  – spectrum analysis, raman

– spin trapping

– surface plasmon resonance

– thermogravimetry

– titrimetry
  – colorimetry
  – complement hemolytic activity assay
  – conductometry
  – neutralization tests
  – potentiometry
  – skin test end-point titration

– ultracentrifugation
  – centrifugation, density gradient
  – centrifugation, isopycnic
  – centrifugation, zonal

– clinical laboratory techniques

– culture techniques
  – cell culture techniques
  – coculture techniques
  – diffusion chambers, culture
  – embryo culture techniques
  – organ culture techniques
  – tissue culture techniques
  – tissue engineering

– cytological techniques
  – autoradiography
  – cell count
  – blood cell count
  – erythrocyte count
  – reticulocyte count
  – leukocyte count
  – lymphocyte count
  – cd4 lymphocyte count
  – cd4-cd8 ratio
  – platelet count
  – sperm count
  – cell fractionation
  – cell fusion
  – cell separation
  – cytapheresis
  – leukapheresis
  – plateletpheresis
  – immunomagnetic separation
  – leukocyte reduction procedures
  – colony-forming units assay
  – tumor stem cell assay
  – cytogenetic analysis
  – chromosome banding
  – mitotic index
  – cytophotometry
  – flow cytometry
  – image cytometry
  – laser scanning cytometry
  – diffusion chambers, culture
  – drug screening assays, antitumor
  – tumor stem cell assay
  – electroporation
  – histocytochemistry
  – immunohistochemistry
  – periodic acid-schiff reaction
  – prussian blue reaction
  – histocytological preparation techniques
  – microtomy
  – cryoultramicrotomy
  – frozen sections
  – replica techniques
  – corrosion casting
  – freeze fracturing
  – freeze etching
  – staining and labeling
  – chromosome banding
  – in situ hybridization
  – in situ hybridization, fluorescence
  – chromosome painting
  – primed in situ labeling
  – negative staining
  – periodic acid-schiff reaction
  – prussian blue reaction
  – shadowing (histology)
  – silver staining
  – tissue embedding
  – paraffin embedding
  – plastic embedding
  – tissue preservation
  – cryopreservation
  – freeze drying
  – freeze substitution
  – tissue fixation
  – karyometry
  – patch-clamp techniques

– molecular diagnostic techniques

– histological techniques
  – autoradiography
  – bone demineralization technique
  – decalcification technique
  – histocytochemistry
  – immunohistochemistry
  – fluorescent antibody technique
  – fluorescent antibody technique, direct
  – fluorescent antibody technique, indirect
  – periodic acid-schiff reaction
  – prussian blue reaction
  – histocytological preparation techniques
  – microdissection
  – microtomy
  – cryoultramicrotomy
  – frozen sections
  – replica techniques
  – corrosion casting
  – freeze fracturing
  – freeze etching
  – staining and labeling
  – chromosome banding
  – in situ hybridization
  – in situ hybridization, fluorescence
  – chromosome painting
  – primed in situ labeling
  – negative staining
  – periodic acid-schiff reaction
  – prussian blue reaction
  – shadowing (histology)
  – silver staining
  – tissue embedding
  – paraffin embedding
  – plastic embedding
  – tissue preservation
  – cryopreservation
  – freeze drying
  – freeze substitution
  – tissue fixation

– microbiological techniques
  – bacteriological techniques
  – bacterial typing techniques
  – bacteriophage typing
  – ribotyping
  – serotyping
  – limulus test
  – colony count, microbial
  – microbial sensitivity tests
  – serum bactericidal test
  – mycological typing techniques
  – serial passage
  – viral load
  – virus cultivation
  – plaque assay
  – virus inactivation
  – xenodiagnosis

– combinatorial chemistry techniques

– constriction

– containment of biohazards

– dermatoglyphics

– diet

– diet, atherogenic

– diet, cariogenic

– fasting

– dilatation

– drug administration routes

– administration, inhalation

– administration, intranasal

– administration, oral
  – administration, buccal
  – administration, sublingual

– administration, rectal

– administration, topical
  – administration, buccal
  – administration, cutaneous
  – administration, intranasal
  – administration, intravaginal
  – administration, intravesical
  – administration, rectal

– chemotherapy, cancer, regional perfusion

– infusions, parenteral
  – infusions, intra-arterial
  – infusions, intralesional
  – infusions, intraosseous
  – infusions, intravenous

– injections
  – injections, intra-arterial
  – injections, intra-articular
  – injections, intralesional
  – injections, intralymphatic
  – injections, intramuscular
  – injections, intraperitoneal
  – injections, intravenous
  – injections, intraventricular
  – injections, spinal
  – injections, epidural
  – blood patch, epidural
  – injections, subcutaneous
  – injections, intradermal
  – injections, jet
  – biolistics
  – microinjections

– instillation, drug

– iontophoresis

– phonophoresis

– drug administration schedule

– pulse therapy, drug

– embryo research

– research embryo creation

– epidemiologic methods

– contact tracing

– data collection
  – geriatric assessment
  – health surveys
  – behavioral risk factor surveillance system
  – dental health surveys
  – dental plaque index
  – dmf index
  – oral hygiene index
  – periodontal index
  – health status indicators
  – apache
  – severity of illness index
  – karnofsky performance status
  – sickness impact profile
  – mass screening
  – anonymous testing
  – genetic screening
  – mass chest x-ray
  – multiphasic screening
  – neonatal screening
  – vision screening
  – nutrition surveys
  – diet surveys
  – population surveillance
  – sentinel surveillance
  – health care surveys
  – interviews
  – focus groups
  – narration
  – nutrition assessment
  – nutrition surveys
  – diet surveys
  – questionnaires
  – records
  – birth certificates
  – death certificates
  – dental records
  – hospital records
  – medical records
  – medical record linkage
  – medical records systems, computerized
  – medical records, problem-oriented
  – trauma severity indices
  – abbreviated injury scale
  – glasgow coma scale
  – glasgow outcome scale
  – injury severity score
  – nursing records
  – registries
  – seer program
  – vital statistics
  – life expectancy
  – life tables
  – morbidity
  – basic reproduction number
  – incidence
  – prevalence
  – mortality
  – cause of death
  – child mortality
  – fatal outcome
  – fetal mortality
  – hospital mortality
  – infant mortality
  – maternal mortality
  – survival rate
  – pregnancy rate
  – birth rate

– disease notification

– epidemiology, molecular

– sentinel surveillance

– statistics
  – actuarial analysis
  – analysis of variance
  – multivariate analysis
  – area under curve
  – cluster analysis
  – small-area analysis
  – space-time clustering
  – confidence intervals
  – data interpretation, statistical
  – discriminant analysis
  – factor analysis, statistical
  – matched-pair analysis
  – models, statistical
  – likelihood functions
  – linear models
  – logistic models
  – models, economic
  – models, econometric
  – nomograms
  – proportional hazards models
  – monte carlo method
  – probability
  – bayes theorem
  – likelihood functions
  – markov chains
  – odds ratio
  – proportional hazards models
  – risk
  – logistic models
  – risk assessment
  – risk factors
  – uncertainty
  – regression analysis
  – least-squares analysis
  – linear models
  – logistic models
  – proportional hazards models
  – sensitivity and specificity
  – statistical distributions
  – binomial distribution
  – chi-square distribution
  – normal distribution
  – poisson distribution
  – statistics, nonparametric
  – stochastic processes
  – markov chains
  – survival analysis
  – disease-free survival

– epidemiologic study characteristics
  – epidemiologic studies
  – case-control studies
  – retrospective studies
  – cohort studies
  – longitudinal studies
  – follow-up studies
  – prospective studies
  – cross-sectional studies
  – seroepidemiologic studies
  – hiv seroprevalence
  – clinical trials
  – clinical trials, phase i
  – clinical trials, phase ii
  – clinical trials, phase iii
  – clinical trials, phase iv
  – controlled clinical trials
  – randomized controlled trials
  – multicenter studies
  – feasibility studies
  – intervention studies
  – pilot projects
  – sampling studies
  – twin studies

– epidemiologic research design
  – control groups
  – cross-over studies
  – double-blind method
  – matched-pair analysis
  – meta-analysis
  – random allocation
  – reproducibility of results
  – sample size
  – sensitivity and specificity
  – predictive value of tests
  – roc curve
  – single-blind method

– equipment design

– prosthesis design
  – prosthesis coloring

– equipment failure

– intrauterine device expulsion

– prosthesis failure

– equipment failure analysis

– equipment reuse

– equipment safety

– ergometry

– exercise test

– euthanasia, animal

– evaluation studies

– clinical trials
  – clinical trials, phase i
  – clinical trials, phase ii
  – clinical trials, phase iii
  – clinical trials, phase iv
  – controlled clinical trials
  – randomized controlled trials
  – multicenter studies

– device approval

– drug approval
  – investigational new drug application

– drug evaluation

– drug evaluation, preclinical
  – drug screening assays, antitumor
  – tumor stem cell assay
  – xenograft model antitumor assays
  – subrenal capsule assay
  – microbial sensitivity tests
  – serum bactericidal test
  – parasitic sensitivity tests

– product surveillance, postmarketing
  – adverse drug reaction reporting systems
  – clinical trials, phase iv

– program evaluation

– reproducibility of results

– fetal research

– food analysis

– genetic techniques

– chromatin immunoprecipitation

– chromosome mapping
  – chromosome walking
  – physical chromosome mapping
  – contig mapping
  – radiation hybrid mapping
  – restriction mapping

– cloning, molecular
  – artificial gene fusion
  – two-hybrid system techniques

– cloning, organism

– contig mapping

– crosses, genetic
  – genetic complementation test

– cytogenetic analysis
  – chromosome banding
  – in situ hybridization, fluorescence
  – chromosome painting
  – spectral karyotyping
  – karyotyping
  – spectral karyotyping
  – sex determination (analysis)

– dna fingerprinting
  – ribotyping

– dna footprinting

– epidemiology, molecular

– gene expression profiling

– gene targeting

– gene transfer techniques
  – biolistics
  – transduction, genetic
  – transfection
  – transformation, bacterial

– genetic engineering
  – directed molecular evolution
  – dna shuffling
  – gene therapy
  – genetic enhancement
  – protein engineering
  – amino acid substitution
  – mutagenesis, insertional
  – mutagenesis, site-directed
  – sex preselection

– heterozygote detection

– in situ nick-end labeling

– molecular diagnostic techniques

– molecular probe techniques
  – biotinylation
  – blotting, northern
  – blotting, southern
  – blotting, southwestern
  – branched dna signal amplification assay
  – oligonucleotide array sequence analysis
  – protein array analysis
  – random amplified polymorphic dna technique
  – two-hybrid system techniques

– mutagenicity tests
  – comet assay
  – micronucleus tests

– Nuclease protection assaysfpatch
  – dna footprinting

– nucleic acid amplification techniques
  – ligase chain reaction
  – self-sustained sequence replication
  – polymerase chain reaction
  – primed in situ labeling
  – random amplified polymorphic dna technique
  – Reverse transcription polymerase chain reaction

– nucleic acid hybridization
  – branched dna signal amplification assay
  – heteroduplex analysis
  – in situ hybridization
  – in situ hybridization, fluorescence
  – chromosome painting
  – primed in situ labeling
  – oligonucleotide array sequence analysis

– pedigree

– restriction mapping

– sequence alignment

– sequence analysis
  – oligonucleotide array sequence analysis
  – sequence analysis, dna
  – dna mutational analysis
  – sequence analysis, protein
  – peptide mapping
  – protein footprinting
  – sequence analysis, rna

– hardness tests

– human experimentation

– autoexperimentation

– immersion

– immobilization

– restraint, physical
  – hindlimb suspension

– immunologic techniques

– cell migration inhibition

– cytotoxicity tests, immunologic
  – complement hemolytic activity assay

– epitope mapping

– hemolytic plaque technique

– histocompatibility testing
  – lymphocyte culture test, mixed

– immune adherence reaction

– immunization
  – immunization, passive
  – adoptive transfer
  – immunotherapy, adoptive
  – immunization schedule
  – immunization, secondary
  – immunotherapy, active
  – vaccination
  – mass immunization

– immunoassay
  – immunoblotting
  – blotting, western
  – blotting, far-western
  – immunoenzyme techniques
  – enzyme-linked immunosorbent assay
  – enzyme multiplied immunoassay technique
  – immunosorbent techniques
  – enzyme-linked immunosorbent assay
  – radioallergosorbent test
  – radioimmunoprecipitation assay
  – radioimmunosorbent test
  – radioimmunoassay
  – immunoradiometric assay
  – radioallergosorbent test
  – radioimmunoprecipitation assay
  – radioimmunosorbent test

– immunohistochemistry
  – fluorescent antibody technique
  – antibody-coated bacteria test, urinary
  – fluorescent antibody technique, direct
  – fluorescent antibody technique, indirect
  – fluoroimmunoassay
  – fluorescence polarization immunoassay
  – immunoenzyme techniques
  – enzyme-linked immunosorbent assay
  – enzyme multiplied immunoassay technique

– immunophenotyping

– immunoprecipitation
  – chromatin immunoprecipitation
  – precipitin tests
  – flocculation tests
  – immunodiffusion
  – immunoelectrophoresis
  – counterimmunoelectrophoresis
  – immunoelectrophoresis, two-dimensional
  – radioimmunoprecipitation assay

– immunosuppression
  – desensitization, immunologic
  – graft enhancement, immunologic
  – lymphocyte depletion
  – transplantation conditioning

– leukocyte adherence inhibition test

– lymphocyte activation

– monitoring, immunologic

– radioimmunodetection

– rosette formation

– serotyping

– skin window technique

– indicator dilution techniques

– dye dilution technique

– radioisotope dilution technique

– thermodilution

– interferometry

– microscopy, interference
  – microscopy, phase-contrast

– moire topography

– intubation

– intubation, gastrointestinal

– intubation, intratracheal
  – laryngeal masks

– irrigation

– bronchoalveolar lavage

– gastric lavage

– peritoneal lavage

– vaginal douching

– ischemic preconditioning

– ischemic preconditioning, myocardial

– isotope labeling

– manometry

– rhinomanometry

– materials testing

– methods

– microchip analytical procedures

– microfluidic analytical techniques
  – electrophoresis, microchip

– microarray analysis
  – oligonucleotide array sequence analysis
  – protein array analysis
  – tissue array analysis

– micromanipulation

– microdissection

– microinjections

– microsurgery

– microscopy

– microscopy, acoustic

– microscopy, confocal
  – laser scanning cytometry

– microscopy, electron
  – cryoelectron microscopy
  – electron probe microanalysis
  – microscopy, electron, scanning
  – microscopy, electron, transmission
  – microscopy, electron, scanning transmission
  – microscopy, energy-filtering transmission electron
  – microscopy, immunoelectron

– microscopy, fluorescence
  – microscopy, fluorescence, multiphoton

– microscopy, interference
  – microscopy, phase-contrast

– microscopy, polarization

– microscopy, scanning probe
  – microscopy, atomic force
  – microscopy, scanning tunneling

– microscopy, ultraviolet

– microscopy, video

– photomicrography

– models, animal

– disease models, animal
  – arthritis, experimental
  – diabetes mellitus, experimental
  – liver cirrhosis, experimental
  – neoplasms, experimental
  – leukemia, experimental
  – liver neoplasms, experimental
  – mammary neoplasms, experimental
  – melanoma, experimental
  – sarcoma, experimental
  – nervous system autoimmune disease, experimental
  – encephalomyelitis, autoimmune, experimental
  – myasthenia gravis, autoimmune, experimental
  – neuritis, autoimmune, experimental
  – radiation injuries, experimental

– molecular probe techniques

– biosensing techniques
  – surface plasmon resonance

– blotting, far-western

– blotting, northern

– blotting, southern

– blotting, southwestern

– blotting, western

– branched dna signal amplification assay

– immunoassay
  – immunoblotting
  – blotting, western
  – immunoenzyme techniques
  – enzyme-linked immunosorbent assay
  – enzyme multiplied immunoassay technique
  – immunosorbent techniques
  – enzyme-linked immunosorbent assay
  – radioallergosorbent test
  – radioimmunoprecipitation assay
  – radioimmunosorbent test
  – radioimmunoassay
  – immunoradiometric assay
  – radioallergosorbent test
  – radioimmunoprecipitation assay
  – radioimmunosorbent test

– oligonucleotide array sequence analysis

– protein array analysis

– protein interaction mapping
  – blotting, far-western
  – epitope mapping
  – two-hybrid system techniques

– random amplified polymorphic dna technique

– neoplasm transplantation

– xenograft model antitumor assays
  – subrenal capsule assay

– neuromuscular blockade

– oscillometry

– parabiosis

– cross circulation

– perfusion

– reperfusion
  – myocardial reperfusion

– photography

– photography, dental

– physical conditioning, animal

– physical stimulation

– acoustic stimulation

– electric stimulation
  – electroshock

– photic stimulation

– physiognomy

– preservation, biological

– cryopreservation
  – freeze drying
  – freeze substitution

– refrigeration

– tissue preservation
  – blood preservation
  – cold ischemia
  – organ preservation
  – semen preservation

– prosthesis fitting

– radiometry

– radiation dosage

– radiation monitoring
  – body burden
  – film dosimetry
  – thermoluminescent dosimetry

– scintillation counting

– spectrometry, gamma

– spectrometry, x-ray emission
  – electron probe microanalysis

– whole-body counting

– reproductive techniques

– breeding
  – estrus detection
  – estrus synchronization
  – hybridization, genetic
  – inbreeding

– cloning, organism

– embryo disposition

– fallopian tube patency tests

– ovulation detection

– ovulation prediction

– reproductive techniques, assisted
  – embryo transfer
  – fertilization in vitro
  – sperm injections, intracytoplasmic
  – posthumous conception
  – gamete intrafallopian transfer
  – insemination, artificial
  – insemination, artificial, heterologous
  – insemination, artificial, homologous
  – oocyte donation
  – ovulation induction
  – superovulation
  – zygote intrafallopian transfer

– rheology

– hemorheology

– laser-doppler flowmetry

– microfluidics

– sound spectrography

– stereotaxic techniques

– neuronavigation

– radiosurgery

– substance abuse detection

– technology, pharmaceutical

– combinatorial chemistry techniques
  – selex aptamer technique

– dosage forms

– drug compounding

– drug incompatibility

– drug labeling

– drug packaging

– drug stability

– drug storage

– enzyme stability

– technology, radiologic

– teleradiology

– toxicity tests

– acute toxicity tests
  – skin irritancy tests

– carcinogenicity tests

– toxicity tests, chronic

– cytotoxicity tests, immunologic

– inhibitory concentration 50

– lethal dose 50

– maximum tolerated dose

– mutagenicity tests
  – comet assay

– no-observed-adverse-effect level

– trauma severity indices

– abbreviated injury scale

– glasgow coma scale

– glasgow outcome scale

– injury severity score

– weightlessness countermeasures

– weightlessness simulation

– hindlimb suspension

– whole body imaging

– whole-body irradiation

The list continues at List of MeSH codes (E06).

E05